Made by Maceo is a 2003 album by Maceo Parker.

Track listing
All tracks composed by Maceo Parker; except where indicated
"Come By and See"  
"Off the Hook" 
"Hats Off to Harry"
"Quick Step
"Those Girls" (Music: Parker, Lyrics: Corey Parker) 
"Moonlight in Vermont" (John Blackburn, Karl Suessdorf) 
"Lady Luck" (Lloyd Price, Harold Logan) 
"Don't Say Goodnight" 
"Once You get Started"
"Those Girls" (instrumental) 
"Lady Luck Reprise" (Lloyd Price, Harold Logan)

Personnel
Maceo Parker - vocals, percussion, alto saxophone
Candy Dulfer - alto saxophone
Vincent Henry - tenor saxophone
Will Boulware - keyboards
Greg Boyer - trombone
Rodney Curtis - bass
Bruno Speight - guitar
Jamal Thomas - drums
Ron Tooley - trumpet
Corey Parker - vocals
Cynthia Johnson, Giorge Pettus, Carrie Harrington - background vocals

2003 albums
Maceo Parker albums